Andreas "Andy" Brehme (born 9 November 1960) is a German football coach and former football defender. At international level, he is best known for scoring the winning goal for Germany in the 1990 FIFA World Cup Final against Argentina from an 85th-minute penalty kick. At club level, he played for several teams in Germany, and also had spells in Italy and Spain.

A versatile attacking full back with an eye for goal, Brehme was capable of playing anywhere along the flank on either side of the pitch, and was known for his crossing ability, ambidexterity, and his accuracy from free-kicks and penalties, possessing a powerful shot.

Club career
Brehme was born in Hamburg and started his career with the city's local side HSV Barmbek-Uhlenhorst.

He played for 1. FC Kaiserslautern from 1981 to 1986, before moving to Bayern Munich, where he played from 1986 to 1988, winning the Bundesliga in 1987. After that, he joined Italian side Inter Milan, playing there from 1988 to 1992, alongside compatriots Lothar Matthäus and Jürgen Klinsmann, and winning the Serie A in 1989 – also being named player of the year – and the UEFA Cup in 1991. Brehme played the 1992–93 season at Real Zaragoza in La Liga, before returning to Germany once again in 1993 to play for Kaiserslautern once again. He won the German Cup with the club in 1996, although they suffered relegation during the same season; nevertheless, Brehme remained with the team even when they were relegated, playing a key role in the side's immediate promotion the following season. After subsequently winning the Bundesliga with the club in 1998, Brehme ended his playing career as a footballer after having played 301 matches.

International career
As a member of the (West) Germany national team, Brehme took part at UEFA Euro 1984, the 1984 Summer Olympics, the 1986 FIFA World Cup, UEFA Euro 1988, the 1990 FIFA World Cup, UEFA Euro 1992, and the 1994 World Cup; he was named to the team of tournament at Euro 84, and helped Germany to the semi-finals of Euro 88, on home soil, scoring a goal in the nation's 1–1 opening draw against Italy. At Euro 1992, he won a runners-up medal, as Germany lost out 2–0 to Denmark in the final; he was once again named to the team of the tournament. Brehme won a runners-up medal at the 1986 FIFA World Cup, as Germany lost the final to Argentina, yet he won the World Cup in 1990 against the same opponents, later being named to the competition's All-star team. In the 1986 World Cup semi-final he scored a deflected free-kick against France, and in the 1990 semi-final he also scored a free-kick goal against England, which also took a deflection off of English defender Paul Parker, however. In the 1990 edition of the tournament, en route to the final, he also previously set up Klinsmann's headed goal in Germany's opening 4–1 against Yugoslavia, and scored the second goal against the Netherlands with a right-footed curler in the second round. In the 1990 World Cup final, a 1–0 victory over Argentina, he scored the goal, a penalty kick with his right foot. The only other penalty kick, taken in open play for Germany, was against England in a 1986 World Cup warm-up match in Mexico. Brehme missed his spot-kick, however, with Peter Shilton saving his shot. Brehme scored in the victorious penalty-shootout against Mexico in the 1986 World Cup quarter-finals with his left foot, while he scored his nation's first spot-kick in the penalty shoot-out victory against England in the 1990 World Cup semi-finals with his right foot. Brehme's last of his 86 caps for the national team came during the 1994 FIFA World Cup, which ended with a disappointing quarter-final exit for his team after a loss against Bulgaria.

Managerial career
After retiring from football, Brehme went on to become a coach. He managed his former club 1. FC Kaiserslautern from 2000 to 2002, when he was dismissed because his team was in danger of being relegated. This was seen as a case of déjà vu, as he was part of the team that was relegated in 1996, but stuck with the team and was a key figure in their immediate promotion and title win the following year. He then managed 2. Bundesliga side SpVgg Unterhaching, but was released from his contract in April 2005, again because the club was in danger of being relegated. He was then assistant coach alongside Giovanni Trapattoni at VfB Stuttgart, but both were sacked after only a few months at the club.

Style of play
Though more often a defender, Brehme showed an exceptional knack for getting forward and finding the back of the net throughout his career, possessing an extremely powerful and accurate shot with either foot; his eye for goal is demonstrated by the fact that he scored at every club he played for, as well as the German national side.

An efficient attacking full-back or wing-back, Brehme was regarded as one of the best left-backs of his generation; although he was usually deployed on the left side of his team's defensive line, he was a highly versatile player, who was capable of playing anywhere along the flank, on either side of the pitch, and could also play in a more offensive role, as a winger. He was even used in the centre of the pitch on occasion, as a defensive midfielder. Although he was not particularly quick, he was known for his excellent technical ability, stamina, defensive skills, anticipation, and tactical intelligence, as well as his ability to make attacking runs, which enabled him to cover the flank effectively and contribute at both ends of the pitch.

A set-piece specialist, Brehme is considered to be one of the greatest free-kick takers and crossers of all time, and was known for his ability to strike the ball with power and swerve. However, Brehme's most distinctive skill was the fact that he was one of the few players in the world who was genuinely ambidextrous, and could play with both feet equally well, making him very valuable as an outfield player; his ability with either foot led his national team manager Franz Beckenbauer to state: "I have known Andy for 20 years and I still don't know if he is right or left-footed". He was well known for taking penalties (although not exclusively) with his right foot and taking free kicks and corners with his left foot; this made him quite an unpredictable player to read during matches. Although he was reportedly naturally left-footed, it is believed that Brehme felt that his right foot was actually more accurate than his left, but that he had a more powerful shot with his "weaker" left foot. This was shown when, in the 1990 World Cup final, Brehme took the spot kick that won West Germany the trophy, with his right foot, but four years earlier, Brehme scored in the 1986 World Cup quarter-final penalty shootout against Mexico with a left foot piledriver. In addition to his abilities as a footballer, Brehme was also highly regarded for his strength of character and composure under pressure, as well as for having the tendency to score "clutch" goals for his team in important games, as demonstrated by his ability to score decisive penalties in World Cup knockout matches, which led him to be considered a "big game player" in the media.

Although he was known to be tenacious player, he also stood out for his professionalism throughout his career, both on and off the pitch. Matthäus described Brehme as the best player he played with.

Career statistics

Club

International

Scores and results list Germany's goal tally first, score column indicates score after each Brehme goal.

Honours
1. FC Kaiserslautern
 Bundesliga: 1997–98
 2. Bundesliga: 1996–97
 DFB-Pokal: 1995–96
 DFL-Supercup: runner-up 1996

Bayern Munich
 Bundesliga: 1986–87
 European Cup: runner-up 1986–87
 DFL-Supercup: 1987

Inter Milan
 Serie A: 1988–89
 Supercoppa Italiana: 1989
 UEFA Cup: 1990–91

Real Zaragoza
 Copa del Rey: runner-up 1992–93

Germany
 FIFA World Cup: 1990; runner-up 1986
 UEFA Euro: runner-up 1992

Individual
 UEFA European Championship Team of the Tournament: 1984, 1992
 kicker Bundesliga Team of the Season: 1985–86
 Guerin d'Oro (Serie A Footballer of the Year): 1989
 Pirata d'Oro (Internazionale Player of the Year): 1989
 FIFA World Cup All-Star Team: 1990
 Ballon d'Or – Third place: 1990

References

External links 

 
 
 
 FIFA Profile

1960 births
1986 FIFA World Cup players
1990 FIFA World Cup players
1994 FIFA World Cup players
Living people
FC Bayern Munich footballers
Inter Milan players
1. FC Saarbrücken players
1. FC Kaiserslautern players
FIFA World Cup-winning players
Bundesliga players
2. Bundesliga players
German expatriate footballers
German footballers
German football managers
Germany international footballers
Germany under-21 international footballers
La Liga players
UEFA Euro 1984 players
UEFA Euro 1988 players
UEFA Euro 1992 players
Olympic footballers of West Germany
Footballers at the 1984 Summer Olympics
Real Zaragoza players
Serie A players
Footballers from Hamburg
Expatriate footballers in Italy
Expatriate footballers in Spain
German expatriate sportspeople in Italy
German expatriate sportspeople in Spain
1. FC Kaiserslautern managers
SpVgg Unterhaching managers
Association football fullbacks
UEFA Cup winning players
West German footballers
West German expatriate footballers
West German expatriate sportspeople in Italy